The Jubilee Bridge (also known as the Blue Bridge) is a double leaf rolling bascule bridge which spans the River Dee at Queensferry, Wales, United Kingdom.

History
The bridge was built by Sir William Arrol & Co. between 1925 and 1927. It takes its name from an earlier bridge on the same site which was completed in Queen Victoria's diamond jubilee year of 1897. The abutments of the old bridge are still visible at both sides to the left (facing north) of the current bridge. The remains can be seen at low tide near the abutments.

By the 1960s shipping had ceased on the River Dee. The bridge's lifting mechanism was removed and the roadway fixed permanently in place. In 2005 the Jubilee Bridge was awarded Grade II Listed building status by Cadw.

See also
List of bridges in Wales

References

Bridges in Flintshire
Bascule bridges
Bridges completed in 1927
Grade II listed buildings in Flintshire
Grade II listed bridges in Wales
Road bridges in Wales
Bridges across the River Dee, Wales